The 1925–26 National Challenge Cup was the annual open cup held by the United States Football Association now known as the Lamar Hunt U.S. Open Cup.

History
There were 131 entrants to the tournament. Twenty-five teams (12 western and 13 eastern) were exempt from the qualifying stages because of their relative strength. These included primarily the ASL and St. Louis Soccer League teams.  The remaining 106 teams played off for the seven remaining spots in the first round proper. The preliminary qualifying round featured 44 matches with 18 teams receiving byes. Canadian teams were admitted because several outfits from Essex County, Ontario were affiliated with the Michigan Soccer Association which in turn was a member of the USFA.

Eastern Division

Western Division

a) disqualified after protest
b) aggregate after 3 games

Final

References

Nat
U.S. Open Cup